State Graduation/ Exit Exams in the United States are standardized tests in American public schools in order for students  to receive a high school diploma, according to that state's Secondary Education Curriculum.

References

Graduation
Standardized tests in the United States
Secondary education-related lists